O'Brien may refer to:

People
 List of people named O'Brien, a surname
 O'Brien dynasty

Places

United States
 O'Brien, California, an unincorporated community in Shasta County
 O'Brien, Florida, an unincorporated community in Suwannee County
 O'Brien, Oregon, a census-designated place and unincorporated community in Josephine County
 O'Brien, Texas, a city in Haskell County
 O'Brien, West Virginia, an unincorporated community in Barbour County
 O'Brien County, Iowa, a county

Other places
 O'Brien, Argentina, a town in Buenos Aires Province, Argentina
O'Briens Hill, Queensland, a locality in the Cassowary Coast Region, Australia
 O'Brien Island, in the South Shetland Islands, Antarctica
 O'Brien Island, Chile, in the Magallanes Region, Chile

Ships
 USS O'Brien, a list of ships with this name
 Capitan O'Brien-class submarine three submarines built for the Chilean Navy in 1928–1929
 Oberon-class submarine (also known as O'Brien-class submarine), Chilean Navy submarine class
 Chilean submarine O'Brien (S22), an Oberon-class sub

Other uses
 O'Brien (Nineteen Eighty-Four), the main antagonist in George Orwell's novel
 O'Brien (TV series), a British talk show presented by James O'Brien
 United States v. O'Brien, legal case ruled on by the US Supreme Court regarding draft card burning and the First Amendment's guarantee of free speech

See also
 Brien
 O'Brian, a surname (including a list of people with the name)
 O'Bryan (born 1961), American singer-songwriter
 Justice O'Brien (disambiguation)